Greece competed at the 2008 Summer Paralympics in Beijing, People's Republic of China. The national team of Greece was composed of 69 athletes, 53 men and 16 women, who competed in 11 sports, archery, athletics, boccia, cycling, judo, powerlifting, sailing, shooting, swimming, wheelchair fencing, wheelchair tennis. Contrary to the tradition in the Summer Olympic Games, Greece did not enter first during the parade of nations at the opening ceremony but 69th in name order in Chinese, with the swimmer Charalampos Taiganidis being the team's flag bearer.

Medalists

| width=78% align=left valign=top |

| width=22% align=left valign=top |

Multiple medallists
The following Greek athletes won multiple medals at the 2008 Paralympic Games.

Archery

Men

Women

Boccia

Cycling

Road

Track
Men

Judo

Men

Women

Powerlifting

Men

Women

Sailing

Shooting

Swimming

Men

Women

Tennis

Men

Wheelchair fencing

Men

See also
Greece at the 2008 Summer Olympics

References

External links
Beijing 2008 Paralympic Games Official Site
International Paralympic Committee

Nations at the 2008 Summer Paralympics
2008
Paralympics